The spiny crag lizard or prickly girdled lizard (Pseudocordylus spinosus) is a species of lizard in the family Cordylidae.

Range
It is found in the northern Drakensberg escarpment of Lesotho and adjacent South Africa, besides a population in southern KwaZulu-Natal.

References

Pseudocordylus
Reptiles of South Africa
Reptiles described in 1947
Taxa named by Vivian Frederick Maynard FitzSimons
Taxonomy articles created by Polbot